Otterington railway station was located in the village of South Otterington, North Yorkshire, on the East Coast Main Line. It opened in 1841 and closed in 1958. The station is now a private residence, though the platform can still be seen. The buildings date from the 1930s when the East Coast Main Line was widened.

The station became a listed building in 2018.

References

External links 

Disused railway stations in North Yorkshire
Railway stations in Great Britain opened in 1841
Railway stations in Great Britain closed in 1958
Former North Eastern Railway (UK) stations